"Otra Vez" is a song by American singer Prince Royce. The song was released on December 8, 2022 through Sony Latin & Smiling Prince Music Inc. The music video was released the same day.

Charts

References

2022 songs
2022 singles
Prince Royce songs
Sony Music Latin singles
Songs written by Prince Royce
Spanish-language songs